This is a complete list of the stage works of the German, and later American, composer Kurt Weill (1900–1950).

Works

References

Further reading
Hinton, Stephen (1992), "Weill, Kurt" in The New Grove Dictionary of Opera, ed. Stanley Sadie (London)

External links

Lists of operas by composer
 
 
Lists of compositions by composer